Vincent Richards (March 20, 1903 – September 28, 1959) was an American tennis player. He was active in the early decades of the 20th century, particularly known as being a superlative volleyer. He was ranked World No. 2 as an amateur in 1924 by A. Wallis Myers, and was ranked joint World No. 1 pro by Ray Bowers in 1927 and World No. 1 pro by Bowers in 1930.

Biography
Born in Yonkers, New York, he attended the Jesuit Fordham Preparatory School, attended Fordham University and studied at the Columbia University School of Journalism in 1922.

Richards won the National Boys Outdoor Singles Tournament in 1917. He became a protégé of Bill Tilden after being defeated by the latter in a match, and he then teamed up with him to win the United States doubles championship in 1918 at the age of 15. He remains the youngest male to have ever won a major championship. Twenty-seven years later, in 1945, he and Tilden won the United States Pro doubles title. While Bill Tilden teamed with Richards to win titles together, he was beaten by Richards in both singles and doubles, including for several major titles. During their long rivalry, they faced each other 102 times, with Richards holding a career record of 52–50 against Tilden.

Richards retained his amateur status for 10 years because his ambition was to compete in the 1924 Olympics held in Paris, France. He realized this ambition by winning the gold medal for the United States in both singles and doubles, additionally collecting the silver medal in mixed doubles. Richards is one of two American male tennis players to win the gold medal in both singles and doubles (Beals Wright was the other), and he ranks second all-time with his three medals won in 1924 (second to Reginald Doherty of Great Britain, who won four Olympic tennis medals). Between both men and women, Richards is third behind Venus Williams in first, and Serena Williams in second, with three overall medals, with Williams collecting four gold medals over multiple Olympics. Richards was a semifinalist at the French championships in 1926, where he beat Colin Gregory and Bela Von Kehrling, then lost to Henri Cochet. He was also a semifinalist at the U.S. championships in 1922 (losing to Bill Johnston), 1924 (losing to Tilden), 1925 (where he beat René Lacoste, then lost to Tilden) and 1926 (losing to Jean Borotra). While there was no official ATP Tour in the 1920s, Richards was one of the pioneers in creating a version of a "world tennis tour", playing in the equivalent of all four grand slams during his career, additional major tournaments, and exhibition matches in front of emperors, presidents, and other heads of states. While Tilden may have overshadowed Richards, even in the Davis Cup, Richards held a perfect 5–0 record when he played for his country.

Richards was one of the best singles players of the 1920s and played on several United States Davis Cup teams. In 1927 he was the first prominent male player to turn professional. In 1928, he was still generally considered to be one of the top 5 or 6 players in the world and played a brief tour at the end of the year against Czech player Karel Koželuh, another new professional. Richards only beat Koželuh five times in 20 matches. Richards won the United States Pro Championship in 1927, 1928, and 1930, beating Koželuh in the finals in both 1928 and 1930, and losing to him in the 1929 final. He lost the 1931 final to Tilden and won the U.S. Pro Championships for the last time in 1933, this time beating Frank Hunter in the final. He continued to play in the U.S. Pro championships in most years until 1946. Richards and Tilden won the doubles at the 1945 U.S. Pro championships.

Richards was inducted into the International Tennis Hall of Fame in Newport, Rhode Island in 1959.

Business career
After retiring from tennis, Richards joined the Dunlop Tire and Rubber Company as general manager of the sporting goods division and became vice president.

Personal life
In February 1924, he married Claremont Gushee in Greenwich, Connecticut, and they had three children. She died in 1950. On September 28, 1959, Richards died of a heart attack at Doctors Hospital in New York.

Major finals

Grand Slam tournaments

Doubles: 9 (7 titles, 2 runners-up)

Mixed doubles: 3 (2 titles, 1 runner-up)

Pro Slam tournaments

Singles: 6 (4/2)

Singles performance timeline

Richards was banned from competing in the amateur Grand Slams when he joined the professional tennis circuit in 1927.

References

External links

 
 
 
 
 
 History of the Pro Tennis Wars
 Chapter II: The eminence of Karel Koželuh and Vincent Richards 1927–1928

1903 births
1959 deaths
American male tennis players
Columbia University Graduate School of Journalism alumni
Fordham Rams men's tennis players
French Championships (tennis) champions
Olympic gold medalists for the United States in tennis
Olympic silver medalists for the United States in tennis
People from Yonkers, New York
International Tennis Hall of Fame inductees
Tennis people from New York (state)
Tennis players at the 1924 Summer Olympics
United States National champions (tennis)
Wimbledon champions (pre-Open Era)
Grand Slam (tennis) champions in mixed doubles
Grand Slam (tennis) champions in men's doubles
Medalists at the 1924 Summer Olympics
Professional tennis players before the Open Era
Burials at Woodlawn Cemetery (Bronx, New York)
World number 1 ranked male tennis players
Fordham Preparatory School alumni